Charles Henry Watts II (1926-2001) was the president of Bucknell University from 1964 to 1976. He was named Bucknell's 11th president at the age of 37.

References

External links
Proceedings: the inauguration of Charles Henry Watts II as President of the University, Saturday, the first of May, 1965, Bucknell University, 1965

Presidents of Bucknell University
2001 deaths
Brown University alumni
1926 births
20th-century American academics